Events of 2019 in Finland.

Incumbents 
 President: Sauli Niinistö
 Prime Minister: Juha Sipilä (until 6 of June), Antti Rinne (from 6 of June to 9 of December), Sanna Marin (starting 10 of December)

Events 
26 May – Finland wins the IIHF Ice Hockey World Championship for the third time since 2011
November–December – Finland postal strike controversy 2019

Deaths

January

16 January – Unto Wiitala, Finnish Hall of Fame ice hockey player and official. (b. 1925)

February

4 February – Matti Nykänen, Finnish ski jumper (b. 1963)
5 February – Tapio Lehto, Finnish Olympic triple jumper. (b. 1930)
7 February – Per Olov Jansson, Finnish photographer. (b. 1920)
12 February – Olli Lindholm, Finnish singer and guitarist (b. 1964)
16 February – Eyvind Wichmann, Finnish-born American theoretical physicist. (b. 1928)

March

11 March – Pertti Koivulahti, Finnish ice hockey player (Tappara). (b. 1951)
15 March – Osmo Jussila, Finnish historian. (b. 1938)
17 March – Olavi Mannonen, Finnish modern pentathlete, Olympic silver medalist (1956) and bronze medalist (1952, 1956). (b. 1930)
23 March – Matti Launonen, Finnish table tennis player, Paralympic champion (1992, 1996), complications from a fall. (b. 1944)
24 March – Ensio Hyytiä, Finnish ski jumper, world championship silver medalist (1958). (b. 1938)

April

5 April – Lasse Pöysti, Finnish actor (b. 1927)
6 April – Olli Mäki, Finnish boxer, European amateur champion (1959), complications from Alzheimer's disease. (b. 1936)
13 April – Lydia Wideman, Finnish cross-country skier (b. 1920)
22 April – Oiva Toikka, Finnish glass designer (b. 1931)
April 26 – Reijo Taipale, Finnish singer (b. 1940)

May

May 6 – Pekka Airaksinen, Finnish composer and musician. (b. 1945)
May 28 – Tuulikki Ukkola, Finnish journalist (Kaleva) and politician, MP (1991–1995, 2007–2011) and leader of the Liberal People's Party (1993–1995). (b. 1943)

June

 June 9 – Juhani Wahlsten, Finnish ice hockey player. (b. 1938)
 June 22 – Leevi Lehto, Finnish poet, translator and programmer, multiple system atrophy. (b. 1951)
 June 29 – Kirsti Simonsuuri, Finnish writer and poet, complications from cancer and Parkinson's disease. (b. 1945)
   June 29   – Ilkka Nummisto, Finnish Olympic sprint canoer (1964, 1968, 1972, 1976). (b. 1944)

July

July 9 – Klaus Sahlgren, Finnish diplomat. (b. 1928)
July 11 – Arto Nilsson, Finnish boxer, Olympic bronze medallist (1968). (b. 1948)
July 24 – Claes Andersson, Finnish writer, psychiatrist and politician, MP (1987–1999, 2007–2008). (b. 1937)
July 25 – Jorma Kinnunen, Finnish javelin thrower, Olympic silver medalist (1968). (b. 1941)
July 29 – Mona-Liisa Nousiainen, Finnish Olympic cross-country skier (2014), cancer. (b. 1983)

August

August 23 – Leo Gauriloff, Finnish musician. (b. 1956)
August 27 – Gustav Wiklund, Finnish actor and painter. (b. 1934)
August 29 – Juhani Kärkinen, Finnish ski jumper, world champion (1958). (b. 1935)

September

September 1 – Kari Lehtola, Finnish lawyer, head of the Safety Investigation Authority (1996–2001). (b. 1938)
  September 1   – Jukka Virtanen, Finnish director, actor and screenwriter, cancer. (b. 1933)
September 23 – Harri Hurme, Finnish chess player. (b. 1945)
September 29 – Paavo Korhonen, Finnish nordic skier, world champion (1958). (b. 1928)
  September 29   – Ilkka Laitinen, Finnish lieutenant general, Chief of the Border Guard (2018–2019) and Executive Director of Frontex (2005–2015). (b. 1962)

October

October 1 – Jouko Innanen, Finnish cartoonist. (b. 1952)
October 7 – Jari Laukkanen, Finnish Olympic cross-country skier (1988). (b. 1962)
October 21 – Aila Meriluoto, Finnish poet, writer and translator. (b. 1924)
October 28 – Toivo Salonen, Finnish speed skater, Olympic bronze medalist (1956). (b. 1933)

November

November 5 – Ulf-Erik Slotte, Finnish diplomat, Ambassador to Turkey (1973–1977), Australia (1988–1991) and Ireland (1991–1996). (b. 1931)
November 22 – Antti Rantakangas, Finnish politician, MP (since 1999). (b. 1964)
November 27 – Maarit Feldt-Ranta, Finnish politician, MP (2007–2019). (b. 1968)

December

December 20 – Matti Ahde, Finnish politician, MP (1970–1999, 2003–2011). (b. 1945)

See also

 2019 European Parliament election

References

 
2010s in Finland
Years of the 21st century in Finland
Finland
Finland